Christian Baudry (born December 16, 1955 in Saumur, France) is a former professional footballer.

External links
Christian Baudry profile at chamoisfc79.fr

1955 births
Living people
French footballers
Association football defenders
Angers SCO players
Chamois Niortais F.C. players
Ligue 1 players
Ligue 2 players